is a railway station in Kashiwara, Osaka Prefecture, Japan.  The station is owned by the West Japan Railway Company.

Lines
West Japan Railway Company
Yamatoji Line
Kintetsu Railway
Domyoji Line (N17)

Layout
There are 2 platforms with 4 tracks and a passing track on the 1st level.

Adjacent stations 

	

Railway stations in Osaka Prefecture
Railway stations in Japan opened in 1889